Merunjau is a settlement in Betong, Sarawak, Malaysia. Neighbouring settlements include:

References

Populated places in Sarawak